Bolatusha Creek is a stream in the U.S. state of Mississippi.

Bolatusha Creek is a name derived from the Choctaw language purported to mean either "one who strikes and cuts to pieces" or "little thicket".

References

Rivers of Mississippi
Rivers of Attala County, Mississippi
Rivers of Leake County, Mississippi
Mississippi placenames of Native American origin